Semanotus ligneus is a species of beetle in the family Cerambycidae.

References

Callidiini
Beetles described in 1787